is a metro station on the  Osaka Metro Tanimachi Line (Station Number: T15) located in Asahi-ku, Osaka, Japan.

While situated relatively close to Sekime-Seiiku on the Imazatosuji Line, there are no free transfers between the two stations.

Layout
There is an island platform with two tracks underground.

External links

 Official Site 
 Official Site

References

Asahi-ku, Osaka
Jōtō-ku, Osaka
Osaka Metro stations
Railway stations in Osaka
Railway stations in Japan opened in 1977